was a Japanese football player. He played for Japan national team.

Club career
Hamazaki was born in Osaka Prefecture on March 14, 1940. After graduating from Meiji University, he joined Yawata Steel (later Nippon Steel). The club won 1964 Emperor's Cup. In 1965, Yawata Steel joined new league Japan Soccer League. He retired in 1972. He played 100 games in the league.

National team career
In December 1966, Hamazaki was selected Japan national team for 1966 Asian Games. At this competition, on December 16, he debuted against Singapore. He played 2 games for Japan in 1966. In October 1968, he was selected Japan for 1968 Summer Olympics in Mexico City. Although he did not play in the match, as he was the team's reserve goalkeeper behind Kenzo Yokoyama, Japan won Bronze Medal. In 2018, this team was selected Japan Football Hall of Fame.

On October 10, 2011, Hamazaki died of ruptured varicose veins of intestines in Kitakyushu at the age of 71.

National team statistics

References

External links

 
 Japan National Football Team Database
Japan Football Hall of Fame (Japan team at 1968 Olympics) at Japan Football Association

1940 births
2011 deaths
Meiji University alumni
Association football people from Osaka Prefecture
Japanese footballers
Japan international footballers
Japan Soccer League players
Nippon Steel Yawata SC players
Olympic footballers of Japan
Olympic medalists in football
Olympic bronze medalists for Japan
Medalists at the 1968 Summer Olympics
Footballers at the 1968 Summer Olympics
Asian Games medalists in football
Asian Games bronze medalists for Japan
Footballers at the 1966 Asian Games
Association football goalkeepers
Medalists at the 1966 Asian Games